The king of Assyria (Akkadian: , later ) was the ruler of the ancient Mesopotamian kingdom of Assyria, which was founded in the late 21st century BC and fell in the late 7th century BC. For much of its early history, Assyria was little more than a city-state, centered on the city Assur, but from the 14th century BC onwards, Assyria rose under a series of warrior kings to become one of the major political powers of the Ancient Near East, and in its last few centuries it dominated the region as the largest empire the world had seen thus far. Ancient Assyrian history is typically divided into the Old, Middle and Neo-Assyrian periods, all marked by ages of ascendancy and decline.

The ancient Assyrians did not believe that their king was divine himself, but saw their ruler as the vicar of their principal deity, Ashur, and as his chief representative on Earth. In their worldview, Assyria represented a place of order while lands not governed by the Assyrian king (and by extension, the god Ashur) were seen as places of chaos and disorder. As such it was seen as the king's duty to expand the borders of Assyria and bring order and civilization to lands perceived as uncivilized. As Assyria expanded, its rulers gradually adopted grander and more boastful titles. Early kings used  (representative/viceroy of Ashur), considering the god Ashur to be the true king. From the time of Ashur-uballit I (14th century BC), the rulers instead used king. In time, further titles, such as "king of Sumer and Akkad", "king of the Universe" and "king of the Four Corners of the World", were added, often to assert their control over all of Mesopotamia.

All modern lists of Assyrian kings generally follow the Assyrian King List, a list kept and developed by the ancient Assyrians themselves over the course of several centuries. Though some parts of the list are probably fictional, the list accords well with Hittite, Babylonian and ancient Egyptian king lists and with the archaeological record, and is generally considered reliable for the age. The line of Assyrian kings ended with the defeat of Assyria's final king Ashur-uballit II by the Neo-Babylonian Empire and the Median Empire in 609 BC, after which Assyria disappeared as an independent political unit, never to rise again. The Assyrian people survived the fall of their empire and kept their own cultural and religious traditions (though were Christianized in the 1st–3rd centuries AD). At times, Assur and other Assyrian cities were afforded great deals of autonomy by its foreign rulers after the 7th century BC, particularly under the Achaemenid and Parthian empires.

Introduction

Sources 

Incomplete king-lists have been recovered from three of the major ancient Assyrian capitals (Assur, Dur-Sharrukin and Nineveh). The three lists are largely consistent with each other, all originally copies of a single original list, and are based on the yearly appointments of -officials (the eponymous officials for each year, appointed by the king to preside over the celebration of the New Year festival). Because of the consistency between the list and the method through which it was created, modern scholars usually accept the regnal years mentioned as more or less correct. There are some differences between the copies of the list, notably in that they offer somewhat diverging regnal years before the reign of king Ashur-dan I of the Middle Assyrian Empire (reign beginning in  1178 BC). After his time, the lists are identical in their contents.

The king-lists mostly accord well with Hittite, Babylonian and ancient Egyptian king lists and with the archaeological record, and are generally considered reliable for the age. It is however clear that parts of the list are fictional, as some known kings are not found on the list and other listed kings are not independently verified. Originally it was assumed that the list was first written in the time of Shamshi-Adad I  1800 BC but it now is considered to date from much later, probably from the time of Ashurnasirpal I (1049–1031 BC). The oldest of the surviving king-lists, List A (8th century BC) stops at Tiglath-Pileser II (967–935 BC) and the youngest, List C, stops at Shalmaneser V (727–722 BC).

One problem that arises with the Assyrian King List is that the creation of the list may have been more motivated by political interest than actual chronological and historical accuracy. In times of civil strife and confusion, the list still adheres to a single royal line of descent, probably ignoring rival claimants to the throne. Additionally, there are some known inconsistencies between the list and actual inscriptions by Assyrian kings, often regarding dynastic relationships. For instance, Ashur-nirari II is stated by the list to be the son of his predecessor Enlil-Nasir II, but from inscriptions it is known that he was actually the son of Ashur-rabi I and brother of Enlil-Nasir.

Titles 

Assyrian royal titles typically followed trends that had begun under the Akkadian Empire ( 2334–2154 BC), the Mesopotamian civilization that preceded the later kingdoms of Assyria and Babylon. When the Mesopotamian central government under the Third Dynasty of Ur ( 2112–2004 BC) collapsed and polities that had once been vassals to Ur became independent, many of the new sovereign rulers refrained from taking the title of king, instead applying that title to their principal deities (in the case of Assyria, Ashur). For this reason, most of the Assyrian kings of the Old Assyrian period ( 2025–1364 BC) used the title , translating to "governor of Assyria".

In contrast to the titles employed by the Babylonian kings in the south, which typically focused on the protective role and the piety of the king, Assyrian royal inscriptions tend to glorify the strength and power of the king. Assyrian titularies usually also often emphasize the royal genaeology of the king, something Babylonian titularies do not, and also drive home the king's moral and physical qualities while downplaying his role in the judicial system. Assyrian epithets about royal lineage vary in how far they stretch back, most often simply discussing lineage in terms of "son of ..." or "brother of ...". Some cases display lineage stretching back much further, Shamash-shum-ukin (667–648 BC) describes himself as a "descendant of Sargon II", his great-grandfather. More extremely, Esarhaddon (681–669 BC) calls himself a "descendant of the eternal seed of Bel-bani", a king who lived more than a thousand years before him.

Assyrian royal titularies were often changed depending on where the titles were to be displayed, the titles of the same Assyrian king would have been different in their home country of Assyria and in conquered regions. Those Neo-Assyrian kings who controlled the city of Babylon used a "hybrid" titulary of sorts in the south, combining aspects of the Assyrian and Babylonian tradition, similar to how the traditional Babylonian deities were promoted in the south alongside the Assyrian main deity of Ashur. The assumption of many traditional southern titles, including the ancient "king of Sumer and Akkad" and the boastful "king of the Universe" and "king of the Four Corners of the World", by the Assyrian kings served to legitimize their rule and assert their control over Babylon and lower Mesopotamia. Epithets like "chosen by the god Marduk and the goddess Sarpanit" and "favourite of the god Ashur and the goddess Mullissu", both assumed by Esarhaddon, illustrate that he was both Assyrian (Ashur and Mullissu, the main pair of Assyrian deities) and a legitimate ruler over Babylon (Marduk and Sarpanit, the main pair of Babylonian deities).

To exemplify an Assyrian royal title from the time Assyria ruled all of Mesopotamia, the titulature preserved in one of Esarhaddon's inscriptions reads as follows:

Role of the Assyrian king 

Ancient Assyria was an absolute monarchy, with the king believed to be appointed directly through divine right by the chief deity, Ashur. The Assyrians believed that the king was the link between the gods and the earthly realm. As such, it was the king's primary duty to discover the will of the gods and enact this, often through the construction of temples or waging war. To aid the king with this duty, there was a number of priests at the royal court trained in reading and interpreting signs from the gods.

The heartland of the Assyrian realm, Assyria itself, was thought to represent a serene and perfect place of order whilst the lands governed by foreign powers were perceived as infested with disorder and chaos. The peoples of these "outer" lands were seen as uncivilized, strange and as speaking strange languages. Because the king was the earthly link to the gods, it was his duty to spread order throughout the world through the military conquest of these strange and chaotic countries. As such, imperial expansion was not just expansion for expansion's sake but was also seen as a process of bringing divine order and destroying chaos to create civilization.

There exists several ancient inscriptions in which the god Ashur explicitly orders kings to extend the borders of Assyria. A text from the reign of Tukulti-Ninurta I ( 1243–1207 BC) states that the king received a royal scepter and was commanded to "broaden the land of Ashur". A similar inscription from the reign of Ashurbanipal (668–631 BC) commands the king to "extend the land at his feet".

The king was also tasked with protecting his own people, often being referred to as a "shepherd". This protection included defending against external enemies and defending citizens from dangerous wild animals. To the Assyrians, the most dangerous animal of all was the lion, used (similarly to foreign powers) as an example of chaos and disorder due to their aggressive nature. To prove themselves worthy of rule and illustrate that they were competent protectors, Assyrian kings engaged in ritual lion hunts. Lion-hunting was reserved for Assyrian royalty and was a public event, staged at parks in or near the Assyrian cities. In some cases, the hunt even took place with captive lions in an arena.

Legitimacy 
As opposed to some other ancient monarchies, such as ancient Egypt, the Assyrian king was not believed to be divine himself, but was seen as divinely chosen and uniquely qualified for the royal duties. Most kings stressed their legitimacy through their familial connections to previous kings; a king was legitimate through his relation to the previous line of great kings who had been chosen by Ashur. Usurpers who were unrelated to previous kings usually either simply lied about being the son of some previous monarch or claimed that they had been divinely appointed directly by Ashur.

Two prominent examples of such usurpers are the kings Tiglath-Pileser III (745–727 BC) and Sargon II (722–705 BC). The inscriptions of these kings completely lack any familial references to previous kings, instead stressing that Ashur himself had appointed them directly with phrases such as "Ashur called my name", "Ashur placed me on the throne" and "Ashur placed his merciless weapon in my hand".

Assyrian kings

Early Assyrian rulers

Early names in king lists 
The Assyrian King List includes a long sequence of rulers before Assyria's first confidently attested kings (of the Puzur-Ashur dynasty), though it is suspected by modern scholars that at least portions of this line of rulers is invented since none of the names are attested in contemporary records and many of the names of the earliest rulers rhyme (suggesting an invented pattern). This is further corroborated by the absence of certain figures in the list known to have ruled in Assur prior to the Puzur-Ashur dynasty (the governors under Assur's foreign rulers). The Synchronistic King List diverges from the Assyrian King List and considers Erishum I ( 1974–1935 BC), the fourth king of the Puzur-Ashur dynasty, to be the first king of Assyria. Though it includes earlier names, the Assyrian King List does not list the length of the rule of any king before Erishum I.

Given that the earliest rulers are described as "kings who lived in tents", they, if real, may not have ruled Assur at all but rather have been nomadic tribal chieftains somewhere in its vicinity. As in the Sumerian King List, several names may also have belonged to rulers who were contemporaries/rivals, rather than successors and predecessors of one another. Some researchers have dismissed these names as a mixture of Amorite tribal-geographical names with no relation to Assyria at all. It is possible that the 'kings who were ancestors', who are not attested in any other sources as present at Assur, refer to the ancestors of Shamshi-Adad I ( 1808–1776 BC), given that other sources claim that his father was named Ilu-kabkabu, and they might thus not actually have been kings of Assyria, but rather rulers of Terqa, Shamshi-Adad's supposed ancestral home. Including these figures may have served to justify Shamshi-Adad's rise to the throne, either through obscuring his non-Assyrian origins or through inserting his ancestors into the sequence of Assyrian kings.

The early portion of the Assyrian King List contains these otherwise historically unverified names:

"Kings who lived in tents"
 Tudiya
 Adamu
 Yangi
 Suhlamu
 Harharu
 Mandaru
 Imsu
 Harsu
 Didanu
 Hana

"Kings who were ancestors"

The kings listed in reverse order in the AKL, starting from Aminu and ending with Apiashal(who is also included in the list of kings 
who lived in tents).

"Kings named on bricks"

There are six of them, including three kings that are part of the Old Assyrian empire from Puzur-Ashur I to Ilu-shuma.

Attested early rulers 
A handful of early local rulers of Assur under foreign suzerainty are known from contemporary sources from before the time of Puzur-Ashur I. The precise dates of the highly incomplete sequence of figures listed below are unknown and none of them appear among the rulers before Puzur-Ashur I in the king list. Perhaps their absence could be explained by these figures not being considered to be proper kings.

Puzur-Ashur dynasty (2025–1809 BC) 
The dynasty founded by Puzur-Ashur is conventionally known by modern historians as the 'Puzur-Ashur dynasty' after its founder. Puzur-Ashur I is generally seen as the founder of Assyria as an independent city-state  2025 BC. Some historians on the other hand speculate that Puzur-Ashur was not a new dynastic founder, but that his dynasty actually began earlier, perhaps by Sulili. The dynasty has thus also been termed the 'Sulili–Puzur-Ashur dynasty'. The dynasty has also been referred to simply as the 'Old Assyrian dynasty'. These kings, beginning with Puzur-Ashur I, took power in the aftermath of the collapse of the Neo-Sumerian Empire, which had ruled over Assyria.

Shamshi-Adad dynasty (1808–1736 BC) 
The dynasty founded by Shamshi-Adad I, who deposed the Puzur-Ashur dynasty, is conventionally known as the 'Shamshi-Adad dynasty', after its founder. During the rule of Shamshi-Adad I and his successors, of Amorite descent and originally from the south, a more absolute form of kingship, inspired by that of Babylon, was introduced in Assyria. During the preceding Puzur-Ashur dynasty, royal power in Assur had been more limited than in other cities, with inscriptions describing how the king worked in tandem with the city assembly to establish law and order. The earliest use of the term  (king) in Assyrian inscriptions comes from Shamshi-Adad I's reign. Shamshi-Adad I was also the first Assyrian king to assume the title 'king of the Universe', though these styles fell into a long period of disuse again after his death. The short-lived realm founded by Shamshi-Adad I is sometimes referred to as the Kingdom of Upper Mesopotamia.

Non-dynastic usurpers (1735–1701 BC)

Adaside dynasty (1700–722 BC) 
The dynasty founded by Bel-bani, which ruled Assyria throughout most of its history, is conventionally known as the Adaside or Adasi dynasty, after Bel-bani's father. In Babylonia, this dynasty of kings was called the "Baltil dynasty", Baltil being the oldest portion of the city of Assur.

Sargonid dynasty (722–609 BC)

Later Assyrian kingship

Geopolitical history and context 

The defeat of Ashur-uballit II at Harran in 609 BC marked the end of the ancient Assyrian monarchy, which was never restored. The territory of the Assyrian Empire was split between the Neo-Babylonian and Median empires. The Assyrian people survived the fall of the empire, though Assyria continued to be a sparsely populated and marginal region under the Neo-Babylonian and later Achaemenid empires. Under the Seleucid and Parthian empires, Assyria experienced a remarkable recovery. Under the last two or so centuries of Parthian rule, archaeological surveys have shown that the region reached a density of settlements that is only comparable to what the region was like under the Neo-Assyrian Empire.

A semi-autonomous city-state under Parthian suzerainty appears to have formed around the city of Assur, Assyria's oldest capital, near, or shortly after, the end of the 2nd century BC. In this period, the ancient city flourished, with some old buildings being restored and some new ones, such as a new palace, being constructed. The ancient temple dedicated to the god Ashur was also restored for the second time in the second century AD, and a cultic calendar effectively identical to that used under the Neo-Assyrian Empire was used. Stelae erected by the local rulers of Assur in this time resemble the stelae erected by the Neo-Assyrian kings, though the rulers are depicted in Parthian-style trouser-suits rather than ancient garb. The rulers used the title  of Assur ("master of Assur") and appear to have viewed themselves as continuing the old Assyrian royal tradition. These stelae retain the shape, framing and placement (often in city gates) of stelae erected under the ancient kings and also depict the central figure in reverence of the moon and sun, an ever-present motif in the ancient royal stelae. This second period of prominent Assyrian cultural development at Assur came to and with the conquests of the Sasanian Empire in the region,  240, whereafter the Ashur temple was destroyed again and the city's people were dispersed.

City-lords of Assur 
The sequence of local rulers of Assur under the three or four centuries of Parthian suzerainty is poorly known. Only five names are attested and their dates, their precise order and how they relate to each other is not clear. The order used here follows Aggoula (1985). Note that there are large gaps in this sequence.

See also 
 List of kings of Babylon – for the Babylonian kings
 List of Mesopotamian dynasties – for other dynasties and kingdoms in ancient Mesopotamia

Notes

References

Bibliography

Web sources 

 

 
King lists
Lists of monarchs
Kings
Middle East-related lists